Spirobranchus kraussii, the blue coral-worm, is a species of marine invertebrate in the family Serpulidae of order Sabellida. It is native to the Indian Ocean.

Synonyms
Placostegus caeruleus Schmarda, 1861 (confused, subjective synonym of two other taxa)
Placostegus cariniferus kraussii Baird, 1865 (superseded original combination)
Placostegus latiligulatus Baird, 1865
Placostegus ornatus articulata Mörch, 1863 (subjective synonym)
Pomatoceros (Pomatoleios) caerulescens Augener, 1922 (subjective synonym)
Pomatoleios caerulescens Augener, 1922 (subjective synonym)
Pomatoleios crosslandi Pixell, 1913 (subjective synonym)
Pomatoleios kraussii (Baird, 1865) (superseded recombination)
Pomatoleios kraussii manilensis Pillai, 1965 (subjective synonym)

Distribution
Indo-West Pacific
Cape Peninsula to Mozambique
South Africa
Mediterranean Sea (alien)
Gulf of Mexico (from synonym)
Madagascar (from synonym)
North Atlantic Ocean European waters [from synonym]
Red Sea
Persian Gulf
Australia
Japan
India
Hawaii

Description
The head has two rows of feathery branches and a stalked operculum with two pointed wings and a flat cap. Length about 15mm and tubes are about 2mm inside diameter.

Habitat 
The blue coral-worm builds massive colonies of interwoven calcareous tubes, which can be locally abundant on moderately exposed rocky shores. It is a filter feeder.

References

Animals described in 1865
Serpulidae